Ewen Cameron (10 April 1860 – 30 March 1906) was a politician, member of the Victorian Legislative Assembly.

Cameron was born in Morgiana near Hamilton, Victoria, the son of John Cameron and his wife Barbara Taylor. He was a grazier outside of politics, managing his family's property after his father's death, managing a property at Paschendale (then known as Struan) for five years, then at "Cloverdale", near Condah and Sinclair estate at Drumborg. He was elected to the Victorian Legislative Assembly on 1 November 1900, serving until his death in office in 1906.

Cameron married Emma Harriet, née Nunn, and had four children. Maud Cameron became a teacher and school headmistress; Winifred became a doctor; and Edith became a nurse and served in Europe in World War I.

References

1860 births
1906 deaths
20th-century Australian politicians
People from Victoria (Australia)
Members of the Victorian Legislative Assembly
19th-century Australian politicians